The Haverstraw–Ossining Ferry is a passenger ferry which connects Haverstraw, New York with Ossining, New York over the Haverstraw Bay and Hudson River.  The ferry operates during rush hours on weekdays only, primarily transporting commuters from the west side of the river to the Ossining Metro-North Railroad station on the east side, where they can transfer to Metro-North Railroad trains headed to Grand Central Terminal in New York City, or Croton-Harmon and Poughkeepsie, via its Hudson Line. Connections are also available at Ossining to the Bee-Line Bus System's 13 and 19 routes. The Ossining terminal is at a pier adjacent to the west side of the station, and the Haverstraw terminal is at a pier on the eastern end of Dr. Girling Drive. 

The Weehawken, New Jersey-based NY Waterway ferry company has been operating the ferry under contract from the Metropolitan Transportation Authority (along with the Newburgh-Beacon Ferry upstream) since its incarnation on September 5, 2000. 

The fare is $4.25 per person ($2.00 for seniors and children 6 to 11 years old) and can either be purchased at the ticket booth at Haverstraw dock, or paid in cash only on board. The trip across the river takes approximately 15 minutes. The ferry operates at 20% of its full capacity on each trip, with 550 passengers per day .

The Admiral Richard E. Bennis (maiden voyage on October 29, 2003), is named after the late Coast Guard captain who directed the waterborne evacuation of Manhattan after the September 11, 2001 attacks. NY Waterway vessels Bayonne, Congressman Robert A. Roe, Jersey City, and Governor Thomas H. Kean (which are all similar to the Admiral Richard E. Bennis), as well as the larger Brooklyn and Peter R. Weiss also operate the ferry on occasions when the Admiral Richard E. Bennis is not available for use. On January 15, 2009, the Admiral Richard E. Bennis was among the many ships that helped evacuate stranded passengers of US Airways Flight 1549 on the Hudson River between New Jersey and Midtown Manhattan. Due to ice conditions on Haverstraw Bay which prompted NY Waterway to suspend service on the ferry that day, it was one of the vessels readily available for use at NY Waterway's main storage facility near the incident in Weehawken.

Gallery

References

External links
Metro-North Railroad – Haverstraw-Ossining ferry
NY Waterway – Haverstraw-Ossining route
NY Waterway – Haverstraw
Metro-North Railroad – Ossining
NY Waterway – Ossining
View a film of the Haverstraw–Ossining Ferry crossing the Hudson River here.

Crossings of the Hudson River
Ferries of New York (state)
Hudson River
Transportation in Rockland County, New York
Transportation in Westchester County, New York
Ossining, New York